Bukit Tigapuluh National Park (also called Bukit Tiga Puluh and Bukit Tigapulah) - The Thirty Hills - is a 143,223 hectare National Park in eastern Sumatra, consisting primarily of tropical lowland forest, largely in Riau province, with a smaller part of 33,000 ha in Jambi province.  It is famous as one of the last refuges of endangered species such as the Sumatran orangutan, Sumatran tiger, Sumatran elephant, and Asian tapir, as well as many endangered bird species. It forms part of the Tesso Nilo Complex biodiversity hotspot. The Park is inhabited by the indigenous peoples of the Orang Rimba and Talang Mamak tribes.

The Park itself has been under consistent threat from illegal logging and palm oil plantations, with two thirds of the park logged.

Flora and fauna
Ecosystem types within the Park include lowland and highland forests, with flora such as Gutta-percha, Shorea, Alstonia scholaris, Dyera costulata, Koompassia excelsa, Rafflesia hasseltii, Calamus draco and various other kinds of rattan.

According to a 1994 survey Bukit Tigapuluh National Park has 59 species of mammal, including six species of primate and 18 species of bat, in addition to 198 species of bird and various species of butterfly.
Mammals include Sumatran orangutan, Sumatran tiger, Sumatran elephant, Asian tapir, sun bear, siamang, crab-eating macaque, Sumatran surili, Sunda loris, clouded leopard, leopard cat, marbled cat, Asiatic wild dog, Malayan civet, Indian muntjac, Sumatran serow and Java mouse-deer.

Bird species include: great argus, little green-pigeon, white-rumped shama, white-bellied woodpecker, crested serpent-eagle, Hill myna, helmeted hornbill, wrinkled hornbill, white-winged wood duck, Storm's stork, garnet pitta and grey-breasted babbler.

The Park also has an important role in protecting the hydrology of the Kuantan Indragiri watershed.

Conservation and threats

In 1982 the National Conservation Plan highlighted the importance of Bukit Tigapuluh ecosystem and classified the two conservation areas of Bukit Besar Wildlife Sanctuary (200,000 ha) and Seberida Nature Reserve (120,000 ha) as priority I conservation areas. In 1992 the Indonesian Government in cooperation with the Norwegian Government conducted a research to document the biological value of the Bukit Tigapuluh ecosystem. As the result of research, the Bukit Tigapuluh ecosystem with an area of 250,000 ha was recommended to be determined as national park. In 1995 Bukit Tigapuluh was established as national park by Ministerial Decree comprising an area of 127,698 ha. In 2002 its area has been extended to 144,223 ha

The Park has been under consistent threat from illegal logging and palm oil plantations, with two thirds of the park logged.  Surrounding buffer zones and wildlife corridors are diminishing, with 30,000 hectares, the largest area of forest remaining outside the Park, released in May 2009 by the Indonesian government for logging.

Orangutan reintroduction

The orangutan reintroduction in Bukit Tigapuluh National Park is organized by the Sumatran Orangutan Conservation Programme (SOCP).

The first reintroduction station for orangutans close to the park was built in 2001 by the German biologist Dr. Peter Pratje, with the support of Frankfurt Zoological Society and local partners. It offers a school-like programme to train individual orangutans, which grew up in captivity, to survive the wild.

In 2002 the Batu Mbelin orangutan quarantine centre was completed near Medan in North Sumatra, which is operated by PanEco. In December 2002 the first orangutans were transferred from the quarantine centre to the rehabilitation centre near Bukit Tigapuluh National Park and reintroduced shortly after.

Nowadays two orangutan reintroduction stations are operated close to the park’s boundaries which focus on reintroducing the animals to the Bukit Tigapuluh National Park.

Since then, over 190 orangutans have been treated at the quarantine centre and over 160 of these have already been transferred to Bukit Tigapuluh for reintroduction under the auspices of the Sumatran Orangutan Conservation Programme. At least 4 infants have also been born to reintroduced mothers, these infants being the first to be conceived and born in the forests of Jambi possibly for more than 100 years.

Cats
Camera traps set up in the Bukit Tigapuluh forest in March and April 2011 by the World Wildlife Fund (WWF) have taken images of 12 rare Sumatran tigers, including a mother playing with cubs. Subsequently, the organisation intensified its campaign against the planned logging of the area. Although the Indonesian government has agreed in 2010 to implement a 2-years moratorium on new forest clearance, the presidential regulation that imposes the moratorium was only signed in May 2011. None of the Bukit Tigapuluh landscape is covered by the moratorium and Asia Pulp & Paper plans to clear large areas of the forest.

In November 2011, the WWF has announced 5 endangered cats in the forests of Riau. Within 3 months of systematic survey using automatic surveillance cameras at the 'corridor' between the Bukit Tigapuluh National Park and Rimbang Baling Sanctuary, they found Sumatran tiger (Panthera tigris sumatrae), Sunda clouded leopard (Neofelis diardi), marbled cat (Pardofelis marmoata), golden cat (Catopurna temmincki, and leopard cat (Prionailurus bengalensis). The cats passing the same tracks all the time in the corridor, but both areas connected by corridor are currently threatened by deforestation.

References

External links
Saving Bukit Tigapuluh video (7:09 min) by Google Earth Outreach
Sumatran Tiger Trust: Bukit Tigapuluh NP

National parks of Indonesia
Protected areas of Sumatra
Orangutan conservation
Geography of Riau
Geography of Jambi
Tourist attractions in Riau
Tourist attractions in Jambi
Animal welfare organizations based in Indonesia